How Cruel is a 12-inch one-sided EP by British singer-songwriter Joan Armatrading, which was released in November 1979 on A&M. The title track had previously appeared on Armatrading's live album Steppin' Out, which was not released in the US. The EP was released in the US and elsewhere, but not in the UK. It peaked at #19 on the Norwegian Albums Chart. It was nominated for the Grammy Award for Best Female Rock Vocal Performance at the 23rd Annual Grammy Awards in 1981. The single from this EP was "Rosie"/"How Cruel" (1979/1980), which reached #49 in the UK and #52 in Australia. "Rosie" was included on Armatrading's first compilation album, 1983's Track Record, as well as her 2004 live album Live: All the Way from America. All four tracks from this EP were placed at the start of the second CD of Armatrading's 2003 compilation album Love and Affection: Joan Armatrading Classics (1975–1983).

Track listing
All tracks composed by Joan Armatrading.

"Rosie" – 3:10
"How Cruel" – 3:04
"He Wants Her" – 3:15
"I Really Must Be Going" – 4:27

Personnel
Joan Armatrading – lead vocals, acoustic guitar
Richard Hirsch, Winston Delandro – guitar
Ben Adkins, Bill Bodine, Durban Betancourt-Laverde – bass
James Lascelles, Mike Storey, Red Young – keyboards
Gary Mallaber, Richard Bailey – drums
Lon Price – saxophone on "How Cruel"
Technical
Henry Lewy, Skip Cottrell, Chris Tsangarides – engineers

Charts

Weekly charts

Year-end charts

Sales and certifications

References

1979 EPs
Joan Armatrading EPs
A&M Records EPs
Albums recorded at A&M Studios
Albums recorded at Morgan Sound Studios
Albums produced by Henry Lewy